CFCN may refer to the radio call signs:

 CFCN-DT, a television station (channel 4) licensed to serve Calgary, Alberta, Canada
 CKMX, a radio station (1060 AM) licensed to serve Calgary, which held the call sign CFCN from 1921 to 1994

It may also refer to:
 CFCN, the Compagnie Franco-Chérifienne de Navigation, a defunct Moroccan shipping line, now incorporated in Compagnie Marocaine de Navigation (Comanav)